The 1996 Southwest Conference men's basketball tournament was held March 8–10, 1996, at Reunion Arena in Dallas, Texas. 

Number 1 seed Texas Tech defeated 3 seed Texas 75-73 to win their 5th championship and receive the conference's automatic bid to the 1996 NCAA tournament. This was the final season of the Southwest Conference tournament since the SWC would cease operations after the 1995-96 school year.

Format and seeding 
The tournament consisted of the top 8 teams playing in a single-elimination tournament.

Tournament

References 

1995–96 Southwest Conference men's basketball season
Basketball in the Dallas–Fort Worth metroplex
Southwest Conference men's basketball tournament